Nathalie Azoulai is a French writer. She was born in 1966. She studied at the École Normale Supérieure, and currently lives in Paris. The author of several books, she is best known for her novel Titus n’aimait pas Bérénice which won the Prix Médicis in 2015.

References

External links

21st-century French novelists
21st-century French women writers
1966 births
Living people
École Normale Supérieure alumni
French women novelists
Prix Médicis winners